The President pro tempore of the Vermont Senate presides over the Senate of the U.S. state of Vermont in the absence of the Lieutenant Governor. The President pro tempore also sets the policy priorities and legislative agenda for the Senate.

Duties
In addition to presiding in the absence of the lieutenant governor, the President pro tempore is third in the gubernatorial line of succession, following the Lieutenant Governor and Speaker of the House of Representatives.

The Senate President pro tempore also serves as a member of the Senate's  Committee on Committees.  The Committee on Committees, made up of the Lieutenant Governor, President of the Senate and a State Senator chosen by his or her peers, is responsible for making committee assignments and designating committee chairpersons, vice chairpersons and clerks.

The Senate President is Senator Philip Baruth of Chittenden County, who took office on January 4, 2023.

History
U.S. Senator Peter Welch served as Senate President from 1985 to 1989 and 2003 to 2007, and was the first Democrat to hold the post. Peter Shumlin, Governor from 2011 to 2017, was President pro tempore from 1997 to 2003 and 2007 to 2011. Becca Balint, Vermont's at-large member of the U.S. House since 2023, served as Senate President from 2021 to 2023.

In the early days of the Vermont Senate, when the legislature met for a relatively short time each year, the lieutenant governor was usually present to preside over regular Senate sessions, and temporary presidents would be chosen on an as-needed basis for periods as short as one day, or even just the morning or afternoon session of one day.  By the 1870s, the position had evolved to the point where a permanent president pro tempore was chosen immediately after the convening of each new legislature.

From the founding of the Republican Party in the 1850s until the 1960s, only Republicans won statewide offices, and Republicans also controlled both the Vermont Senate and Vermont House of Representatives.  As part of the party's Mountain Rule, the post of Senate President, along with that of House Speaker, were used to groom future Governors and Lieutenant Governors.  Including Shumlin, nine Governors have served as Senate President (Eaton, Coolidge, Hendee, Redfield Proctor, McCullough, Prouty, Wills, Mortimer Proctor, Emerson, and Shumlin), as have six Lieutenant Governors who did not attain the governorship (Dale, Hinckley, Bates, Farnsworth, Babcock and Racine).

Compensation
The President pro tempore of the Vermont Senate earned $10,080 in annual compensation as of 2005. Starting in 2007, the salary receives an annual cost of living adjustment.

List

References

Sources

Internet

Books

Newspapers

Politics of Vermont
Government of Vermont
Vermont General Assembly

Presidents pro tempore of the Vermont Senate